Bratz is an American fashion doll and media franchise by MGA Entertainment which debuted on May 21, 2001, with four characters; Yasmin, Cloe, Sasha and Jade, who would become the main franchise characters and have been produced for the majority of the franchise's existence.

Raya was introduced as the fifth main character in 2015, but was removed at the close of the following year. Since its launch, 140 characters have been produced as dolls. All character information is sourced from the non-profit fansite "LookinBratz.com".

Main characters
 Cloe – "Hi! My name is Cloe and I rock! My fashion passion is exotic animal prints and sparkly fabrics! My friends call me Angel because that’s what I am!" She is one of the four original main characters introduced in 2001. Her mother is Polita, her older sister is Sonya, and her younger siblings are Colin and Isa. In the live-action film, her mother's name is Katie. Her boyfriend is Cameron. She was originally named Zoe. She has been voiced by Nikki Kaffee for Bratz: Starrin' & Stylin', Olivia Hack and Britt McKillip for the TV series adaptation and various films, Ashleigh Ball for the Bratz Babyz film, and by Melissa Goodwin Shepherd for the Bratz: CIY Shoppe web series. Hack reprised the role in 2021 for the Talking Bratz web series. She was also portrayed by Skyler Shaye in the live-action film. Her birthday is May 23.
 Jade – "Hey! My name is Jade! My fashion passion is clothes that are xtreme and far out! My friends call me Kool Kat because I love cats! And because I’m cool!!!" She is one of the four original main characters introduced in 2001. She has been voiced by Jillian Thompson for Bratz: Starrin' & Stylin', Soleil Moon Frye and Britt Irvin for the TV series adaptation and various films, Alexandra Carter for the Bratz Babyz film, Brittney Wilson for Bratz: Fashion Pixiez, Nicole Munoz for Bratz Kidz: Sleep-Over Adventure, Kali Edmeston for Bratz Kidz: Fairy Tales, Fryda Wolff for the Bratz: CIY Shoppe web series, and Ratana Vox for the Talking Bratz web series. She was also portrayed by Janel Parrish in the live-action film. Her birthday is November 4.
 Sasha – "Hi! My name is Sasha! My fashion passion is urban street wear like beanies and jean skirts! My friends call me Bunny Boo because I love the hip-hop thang!" She is one of the four original main characters introduced in 2001. Her younger sister is Zama. She was originally named Hallidae. She has been voiced by India Thomas for Bratz: Starrin' & Stylin', Tia Mowry and Dorla Bell for the TV series adaptation and various films, Chantal Strand for the Bratz Babyz film, Ashleigh Ball for Bratz: Fashion Pixiez, Shondalia White for the Bratz: CIY Shoppe web series and Julyza Commodore for the Talking Bratz web series. She was also portrayed by Logan Browning in the live-action film. Her birthday is August 17.
 Yasmin – "Hey! My name is Yasmin! My fashion passion is Bohemian-clothes in earth-tone colors and awesome textures! My friends call me Pretty Princess because I rule!" She is one of the four original main characters introduced in 2001. Her mother is Portia. She is named after Jasmin Larian, daughter of MGA founder Isaac Larian, who initially approved the prototype Bratz concept in 1999 before its 2001 fruition. She was originally named Lupe. She was voiced by Janice Kawaye for Bratz: Starrin' & Stylin', Dionne Quan and Maryke Hendrikse in the TV series adaptation and various films, Bridgitte Taylor for Bratz Kidz: Sleep-Over Adventure, Claire Renaud for Bratz Kidz: Fairy Tales, Heidi Gardner for the Bratz: CIY Shoppe web series, and Valeria Rodriguez for the Talking Bratz web series. She was also portrayed by Nathalia Ramos in the live-action film. Her birthday is July 24.

Secondary characters
 Raya – Her nickname is Sun Rayz. She was introduced in the Hello My Name Is... collection in 2015 as the fifth main Bratz character. She was produced various times throughout 2015 and 2016 until the brand went on another hiatus. She was voiced by Melanie Minichino for the Bratz: CIY Shoppe web series.
 Meygan – "Hey! My name is Meygan! My friends call me Funky Fashion Monkey because even when I just hang, I still look good!" She was introduced in the first edition Xpress It! collection in 2002 as the fifth Bratz character. She has been produced for numerous collections including all spin-off doll lines. Notably, she was one of the few characters to be produced after the 2015 reboot. She was originally named Kayla, which appears on some advertisements before the name change. She appeared in Bratz: Starrin' & Stylin'. She was voiced by Jianna Ballard in the Bratz Kidz: Sleep-Over Adventure film. She makes a feature in the fifth episode of the Talking Bratz web series. She was also featured in the Bratz Rock Angelz, Bratz Fashion Boutique, Bratz: Total Fashion Makeover and Bratz: Flaunt Your Fashion video games. She was only playable in the 2002 Bratz video game. Her birthday is April 15.
 Dana – "Hey! My name is Dana! My friends call me Sugar Shoes because when I step out, I do it sweet!" She is the sister of Tiana and Maribel. She was introduced with the first edition Stylin' Salon 'N' Spa playset in 2002 as the sixth Bratz character and has since been produced in numerous collections. She appeared in Bratz: Starrin' & Stylin'. She was voiced by Chantal Strand in the Bratz Kidz: Sleep-Over Adventure film. She was also featured in the Bratz Fashion Boutique and Bratz: Total Fashion Makeover video games.
 Fianna – "Hi! My name is Fianna! My friends call me Fragrance because I’m as sweet as I smell!" She was introduced with the second edition Stylin' Salon 'N' Spa playset in 2003 and has since been produced in numerous collections. She was featured in the episode of the TV series adaptation titled "Trading Faces" in 2005, where she was voiced by Jessica DiCicco. She was featured in the video game adaptations of Bratz: Rock Angelz, Bratz: Forever Diamondz, the live-action film, Bratz: Girlz Really Rock, Bratz Fashion Boutique, and Bratz: Flaunt Your Fashion. Her birthday is June 12.
 Nevra – "Hi! My name is Nevra! My friends call me Queen B because I’m sweet like honey and in charge!" She was introduced in the Formal Funk Super-Stylin' Runway Disco collection in 2003 and was produced several times throughout the following couple of years. Her girlfriend is Roxxi. She appeared in Bratz: Starrin' & Stylin'. She makes a feature in the fifth episode of the Talking Bratz web series. She was also featured in the Bratz Fashion Boutique and Bratz: Total Fashion Makeover video games.
 Phoebe – "Hi! My name is Phoebe! My twin calls me Sugar because I’m as sweet as sweet can be!" She was introduced in the first edition Twiins collection in 2004 alongside her twin sister, Roxxi, and has since been produced in numerous collections. She appears in the video game adaptations of Bratz Rock Angelz, Bratz Forever Diamondz, the live-action film, Bratz: Girlz Really Rock and Bratz Action Heroez. Her birthday is March 21.
 Roxxi – "Hi! My name is Roxxi! My twin calls me Spice because I like to spice it up!" She was introduced in the first edition Twiins collection in 2004 alongside her twin sister, Phoebe, and has since been produced in numerous collections. Her girlfriend is Nevra. She appears in the Bratz Rock Angelz film, the episodes "New Kid in Town" (in cameo), "Bratz in Franceland", and "Bratz in Playland" of the TV series adaptation, and the Bratz Go to Paris film. She was voiced by Jessica DiCicco. She makes a feature in the fifth episode of the Talking Bratz web series. She was also featured in the video game adaptations of Bratz Rock Angelz, Bratz Forever Diamondz, the franchise's live-action film, Bratz: Girlz Really Rock, Bratz Fashion Boutique, Bratz Action Heroez, Bratz: Total Fashion Makeover and Bratz: Flaunt Your Fashion. She made a cameo in the Bratz: Girlz Really Rock film. Her birthday is March 21.
 Felicia – "Hi, I’m Felicia! I love the glam life, but I love the great outdoors too." Her nickname is Glam Gecko. She was introduced in 2005 for the Campfire/Winter Adventure collection. She was also produced for Sweet Dreamz Pajama Party in 2006, the third edition Big Babyz collection in 2007, the seventh edition Holiday collection in 2021, and the Mowalola collaboration collection in 2022. She is the main character and host of the Talking Bratz web series where she is voiced by Jaimi Gray. She is also featured in the Bratz: Flaunt Your Fashion video game. Her birthday is September 8.
 Katia – "Hi, I’m Katia! I think that the real world is super interesting - I’d rather watch a documentary than a film and I love to read newspapers so I know what’s going on!" Her nickname is Flirty Turtle. She was first introduced as the first edition Holiday doll in 2005 and has been produced numerous times since. Most notably, she appeared as the main character in both Bratz: Genie Magic and its sequel Bratz: Desert Jewelz, voiced by Tara Strong in both films. She was also featured in the video game adaptations of Bratz: Forever Diamondz, the franchise's live-action film, Bratz: Girlz Really Rock and Bratz Fashion Boutique. Her birthday is July 19.
 Kumi – "Hi, I’m Kumi! I love exploring and I wanna see the world!" Her nickname is Lucky Bug. She was first introduced in the Tokyo: A Go-Go Collector's Edition collection in 2004 and was produced several times throughout the following couple of years. Notably, she was one of the few characters to be produced after the 2015 reboot, specifically for the second edition Study Abroad collection in 2016. She re-appeared in the Series 2 reproduction line in 2022. She was featured in the video game adaptations of Bratz Forever Diamondz, the franchise's live-action film adaptation, Bratz: Girlz Really Rock and Bratz: Total Fashion Makeover.
 Vinessa – "Hey there, I’m Vinessa! My friends call me Social Butterfly ‘cause I’m always out and about with my besties!" Her first nickname is Stylin' Sheep. She was introduced in the Ice Champions/On Ice collection in 2006 and was produced for several collections over the following few years. She was also produced for the Babyz, Kidz, Itsy Bitsy, and Lil' Angelz doll lines. She re-appeared in the second edition Trend It! collection in 2012. She was featured in the video game adaptations of Bratz Forever Diamondz, the franchise's live-action film, Bratz: Girlz Really Rock, and Bratz Fashion Boutique and Bratz: Total Fashion Makeover. Her birthday is October 28.
 Sharidan – Her nickname is Sparklin' Sheep. She was introduced in the Forever Diamondz collection in 2006 and was later produced in several collections including the Babyz, Lil' Bratz and Lil' Angelz doll lines. She was voiced by Jessica DiCicco in the Bratz Forever Diamondz film and was also featured in the film's official video game. She made cameos in the Bratz Kidz: Sleep-Over Adventure and Bratz: Girlz Really Rock films. Her birthday is February 2.
 Breeana – She is the younger sister of Cymbeline and the daughter of Dee. She was introduced in the Fashion Pixiez line in 2007 and appeared in the eponymous film as a main character, where she was voiced by Chantal Strand. She was also produced as a Funky Fashion Makeover head for the Magic Hair Collection the same year and made various appearances in the Lil' Angelz doll line.

Minor characters
 Adri – "Hi, I'm Adri. My friends call me Bookworm ‘cuz I love to read!" She was produced once for the 10th Anniversary Bratz collection in 2010. She was featured in the one and only episode of Bratz Rock and in the Bratz Fashion Boutique video game.
 Adrienne – "Hey! My name is Adrienne! My sisters call me Glam Lamb!" She is sisters with Brigitte and Janelle. She was produced for the second edition of the Triiiplets collection in 2007, and the Winter Collection Triiiplets in 2008.
 Ailani – "Hey! My name is Ailani, but my friends call me Cherrie!" She was introduced in the fifth edition of the Lil' Bratz line in 2004 alongside Nazalia, Talia, and Zada, and was a core character of the line until 2006.
 Aira – She is sisters with Kesara and Sivan. She was produced once for the Babyz Triiipletz collection in 2007 with her sisters.
 Alicia – She was produced once for the Babyz Sitter collection in 2006 with her "babysitter" Lana.
 Amelie – She was produced once for the first edition Behind the Scenes Fashion collection in 2006.
 Anyssa – She was produced once for the Couture Collection in 2008 alongside Daphne as one of the only two porcelain dolls to date.
 Ariane – She was produced once for the second edition Behind the Scenes Fashion collection in 2007.
 Ashby – "Hi, I'm Ashby. My friends call me Miss Fit ‘cuz I'm a total sports star!" She was produced once for the 10th Anniversary Bratz collection in 2010. She was featured in the one and only episode of Bratz Rock and in the Bratz Fashion Boutique video game.
 Ashley – She was produced several times for the  Lil' Angelz doll line.
 Aubrey – "Hi. My name is Aubrey. My friends call me Quiz Wiz because I have all the answers!" She was produced once as a component for the fourth edition Passion 4 Fashion collection in 2008. She appeared in the Bratz Passion 4 Mixin′ online game and in the Bratz Fashion Boutique video game.
 Avery – She is sisters with Erin and Rory. She was produced once with her sisters for the third edition Babyz Triiiplets collection in 2007.
 Brielle – She was produced once for the Masquerade by Bratz collection in 2011.
 Brigitte – "Hey! I'm Brigitte! But my sisters call me Pretty Poodle!" She is sisters with Janelle and Adrienne. She was produced for the second edition of the Triiiplets collection in 2007 and the Winter Collection Triiiplets the following year.
 Brigitte – "My friends call me City Songbird ‘cuz I've got a voice that can stop traffic!" She was produced once as a component for the second edition Style It! collection in 2011.
 Carlyn – She was produced several times for the Lil' Angelz doll line.
 Carrie – "Hi, I'm Carrie. My friends call me Coconut ‘cuz I'm tough but sweet!" She was produced once for the franchise's 10th Anniversary collection in 2010. She was featured in the Bratz Fashion Boutique video game.
 Charli – She was introduced in 2007 in the Pampered Pupz collection, and was also produced several times for the Lil' Angelz doll line.
 Ciara – "Hi! My name is Ciara! My twin calls me Spunky ‘cuz I’m always causing trouble!" She was produced once in 2006 alongside her twin sister Diona for the Wicked Twiins collection.
 Ciara – "My friends call me Snaps ‘cuz I'm smart as a whip!" She was produced once in 2011 second edition Xpress It! collection.
 Daphne – She was produced once for the Couture Collection in 2008 alongside Anyssa as one of the only two porcelain dolls to date.
 Daphne – "My friends call me Miss Bliss ‘cuz I’ve got a rosy outlook!" She was produced once in 2011 second edition Xpress It! collection. She was featured in the Bratz Fashion Boutique video game.
 Dee – She is the mother of Breeana and Cymbeline, and the wife of Melvino. She was produced once as a component for the Fashion Pixiez collection in 2007 and got featured in its eponymous film, where she was voiced by Jillian Michaels.
 Destiny – "Hi. My name is Destiny. My friends call me Dynamite because of my sizzling sports skills!"  She was produced once for the fourth edition Passion 4 Fashion collection in 2008. She was featured in the Bratz Fashion Boutique video game.
 Diona- "Hi! My name is Diona! My twin calls me Sparkly ‘cuz I’m in love with my own reflection!" She is the twin sister of Ciara. She was produced once in 2006 for the Wicked Twiins collection with her sister.
 Dresden – "Hi! My name is Dresden. My friends call me Miss Priss because I’m always perfectly primped!" She was produced once for the fifth edition Passion 4 Fashion collection in 2009. She was featured in the Bratz Fashion Boutique video game.
 Emanuelle – She was produced once for the Designed by You collection in 2007. She was named after a contest winner for the Designed by You contest who designed her doll.
 Emy – She was produced once for the first edition Behind the Scenes Fashion collection in 2006.
 Erin – She is sisters with Avery and Rory. She was produced once with her sisters for the third edition Babyz Triiiplets collection in 2007.
 Etienne – She was produced once for the second edition Behind the Scenes Fashion collection in 2007.
 Finora – She was produced once for the Masquerade by Bratz collection in 2011.
 Geneva – She was produced once for the Masquerade by Bratz collection in 2011.
 Isa – She is the younger sister of Cloe, Sonya, and twin sister of Colin. She is also the youngest daughter of Polita. She was produced once as a miniature Lil' Angelz component for the World Familiez Babysitter collection in 2009.
 Janelle – "Hello! My name is Janelle! My sisters call me Chillin’ Cheetah!" She is sisters with Adrienne and Brigitte. She was produced for the second edition of the Triiiplets collection in 2007 and the Winter Collection Triiiplets line the following year.
 Jaylene – "My friends call me Epic Cutie ‘cuz I love a good book!" She was produced once for the second edition Style It! collection in 2011. She was featured in the Bratz Fashion Boutique video game, though her name was misspelled as "Jaylen".
 Jeanne B – She was produced once for the Passion For Fashion: Careers In Style collection in 2008. She was designed and named after Canadian fashion editor Jeanne Beker, and the doll comes with a book she wrote and titled after the collection's name.
 Joelle – "Hi. I’m Joelle. My friends call me Sunshine ‘cuz I’m super bright!" She was produced once for the 10th Anniversary Bratz collection in 2010. She was featured in the Bratz Fashion Boutique video game.
 Keelin – "My friends call me Bee Bop ‘cuz I’m a dancin’ machine!" She is twin sisters with Sorrel. She was produced once for the sixth edition Twiins collection in 2011 alongside her sister.
 Kesara – She is sisters with Aira and Sivan. She was produced once for the Babyz Triiipletz collection in 2007 with her sisters.
 Kiana – "Howdy! My name is Kiana! My friends call me Outlaw Diva because my looks are so good, it should be illegal!" She was introduced in the Wild Wild West collection in 2005. She reappeared in the Series 2 reproduction line in 2022. She was featured in the Bratz Fashion Boutique video game.
 Kiani – "Hi! My name is Kiani! My big sister calls me Prankster Parrot!" Her older sister is Lilani. She was introduced in the Sisterz collection in 2006 alongside her sister. She was also produced as a Babyz component for the Kidz Sisterz collection that same year, and later on, various times as a component for Lil' Angelz.
 Kina – "Hi. My name is Kina. My friends call me Twizt because I’m full of surprises!" She was produced once for the fourth edition Passion 4 Fashion collection in 2008.
 Kirana – She was produced once for the Masquerade by Bratz collection in 2011.
 Krysta – "Hi! My name is Krysta! My twin calls me Shine ‘cuz my natural style shines through!" She is twin sisters with Lela. She was first introduced in the fourth edition Twiins collection in 2006 alongside her sister, and was later produced several times as a component for Babyz and Lil' Angelz.
 Lana – She was produced once for the Babyz Sitter collection in 2006 as the "babysitter" of Alicia.
 Leah – Her nickname is Dainty Doe/Dainty Deer. She was first introduced in the Spring Break collection in 2006 and was produced several times throughout the following few years. She was also produced in the Big Babyz, Itsy Bitsy and Lil' Angelz doll lines. Her birthday is February 16.
 Lela – "Hi! My name is Lela! My twin calls me Fine ‘cuz I sport the latest fashions!" She is twin sisters with Krysta. She was first introduced in the fourth edition Twiins collection in 2006 alongside her sister, and was also produced for the Costume Party collection the same year. She was also produced for the Babyz, Itys Bitsy and Lil' Angelz doll lines.
 Leora – "Hi, I’m Leora. My friends call me Sizzles ‘cuz my style is super hot!" She was produced once for the 10th Anniversary Bratz collection in 2010.
 Lian – She was produced once for the Masquerade by Bratz collection in 2011.
 Lilani – "Hi! My name is Lilani! My sister calls me Sweet Swan!" Her younger sister is Kiani. She was introduced in the Sisterz collection in 2006 alongside her sister, and was also produced as a component for Kidz for the Kidz Sisterz collection the same year. She was also produced as a Kidz component twice in 2007 for the Kidz Fashion Pixiez and School collections.
 Lilee – She was introduced in the third edition Sweet Heart collection in 2006, and was also produced for the fourth edition Sweet Heart collection the following year. She was produced again as a component for Babyz in 2007 for the Storyboook Collection, and several times for the Lil' Angelz doll line.
 Liliana – "Hi, I’m Liliana. My friends call me Dazzle ‘cuz I’m a total charmer!" She was produced once for the 10th Anniversary Bratz collection in 2010. She was featured in the Bratz Fashion Boutique video game.
 Lina – She was produced once for the Fashion Pixiez collection in 2007, and was featured in the eponymous film as the main antagonist, where she was voiced by Sarah Edmondson.
 Lydia – "Hi, I’m Lydia. My friends call me Night Owl ‘cuz I never sleep!" She was produced once for the 10th Anniversary Bratz collection in 2010. She was featured in the Bratz Fashion Boutique video game.
 Maci – "My friends call me Doodles ‘cuz I love to draw!" She was produced once for the third edition Style It! collection in 2011.
 Maribel – "Hi, I’m Maribel! I love hot salsa music—but when I hit the ice, I’m totally chill!" Her nickname is Party Penguin. She is sisters with Dana and Tiana. She was introduced in the Ice Champions/On Ice collection in 2006. The following year she was produced for the Magic Make-Up collection and with her sisters for the second edition Triiiplets collection. She was also produced several times for the Lil' Angelz doll line.
 Marielle – She was produced once for the second edition Behind the Scenes Fashion collection in 2007.
 May Lin – She was produced once for the Tokyo: A Go-Go Collector's Edition collection in 2004.
 Myra – "My friends call me Style Scout ‘cuz I’m one well-dressed nature girl!" She was produced once for the second edition Style It! collection in 2011. She was featured in the Bratz Fashion Boutique video game.
 Nadine – "My friends call me Miss Sterious ‘cuz I’m full of secrets!" She was produced once for the third edition Style It! collection in 2011.
 Nazalia – "Hi! My name is Nazalia, but my friends call me Butterfly!" She was introduced in the fifth edition of the Lil' Bratz line in 2004 alongside Ailani, Nazalia, and Zada, and was a core character of that line until 2006.
 Nevaeh – "Hi! My name is Nevaeh! My twin calls me Tough Cookie because I’ve got great taste mixed with attitude!" She is twin sisters with Peyton. She was produced once for the World Twiins collection in 2008 alongside her sister.
 Nikki – She was produced once for the Designed by You collection in 2007. She was named after a contest winner for the Designed by You contest who designed her doll.
 Nita – "Hi, I’m Nita! My twin knows I’m totally tough!" She is twin sisters with Nora. She was only produced in 2006 for the Babyz The Movie Twiins and Big Babyz The Movie Talking Twiins collections alongside her sister. They were featured in the Bratz Babyz film as main characters, where they were voiced by Britt McKillip, and in the Bratz Babyz video game.
 Noemie – She was produced once for the first edition Behind the Scenes Fashion collection in 2006.
 Nola – "Hi! My name is Nola! I’m also called Creator ‘cuz I’m all about art!" She was introduced in the second edition Babyz Holiday collection in 2006, and was produced again the following year for the Babyz 2-in-1 collection.
 Nona – "Hi! My name is Nona! My twin calls me Star because I’m always the center of a crowd!" She is twin sisters with Tess. She was introduced in the second edition Twiins collection in 2005 alongside her sister. She was produced the following year as a Babyz with her sister for the second edition Babyz Twiins collection, and was later produced several times for the Lil' Angelz doll line.
 Nora – "Hi, I’m Nora! My twin thinks I’m a little shy!" She is twin sisters with Nita. She was first produced in 2006 for the Babyz The Movie Twiins and Big Babyz The Movie Talking Twiins collections alongside her sister. She was produced again for the Flower Girlz collection in 2007. She was featured in the Bratz Babyz film as a main character, voiced by Britt McKillip, and its official video game.
 Odelia – She was produced once for the Masquerade by Bratz collection in 2011.
 Oriana – "Hi! My name is Oriana! My sisters call me Punk Skunk!" She is sisters with Siernna and Valentina. She was introduced in the third edition Twiins collection in 2005 alongside Valentina, though they were later re-released the same year for the Triiiplets collection to include Siernna. They were produced again for the Babyz Triiiplets collection in 2006.
 Peyton – "Hi! My name is Peyton! My twin calls me Sweetie Cake because I’m sugary sweet!" She is twin sisters with Peyton and was produced once for the World Twiins collection in 2008 alongside her .
 Polita – She is the mother of Cloe, Sonya, Colin and Isa and the wife of Tom. She was produced once for the World Familiez collection in 2008. She made a cameo in the Bratz Babyz film in 2006 and appeared in the Bratz Kidz: Sleep-Over Adventure film in 2007. She was also portrayed by Kim Morgan-Greene in the live-action film, where her name is Katie.
 Portia – She is the mother of Yasmin. She was produced once for the World Familiez collection in 2008. She made a cameo in the Bratz Babyz film in 2006 and appeared in the Bratz Kidz: Sleep-Over Adventure film in 2007. She was voiced by Nicole Oliver in the Bratz Babyz: Save Christmas film.
 Raya – She was introduced in the Magic Hair collection in 2007, and produced various times for the Lil' Angelz doll line. She was featured in the Bratz: Flaunt Your Fashion video game.
 Rina – She was produced once for the Design Your Own/second edition Head Gamez! collection in 2006.
 Rina – "My friends call me Tickets ‘cuz I love rock concerts!" She was produced once for the second edition Xpress It! collection in 2011.
 Rinnie – She was produced twice for the Lil' Bratz Rock Starz and Lil' Bratz Beach Bash collections in 2005.
 Rory – She is sisters with Avery and Erin. She was produced once with her sisters for the third edition Babyz Triiiplets collection in 2007.
 Rylan – "My friends call me Space Case ‘cuz I’m all about sci-fi!" She was produced once for the third edition Style It! collection in 2011.
 Sabina – "Hi! My name is Sabina. My friends call me Rock Chick ‘cuz I’m a rockin’ rebel!" She was produced once for the fifth edition Passion 4 Fashion collection in 2009.
 Sana – She was produced once for the Lil' Angelz Surprise Litter collection in 2010.
 Shadi – "Hi, I’m Shadi. My friends call me Trailblazer ‘cuz I’m all about adventure!" She was introduced in the 10th Anniversary Bratz collection in 2010, and was produced once more for the second edition Trend It! collection in 2012. She was featured in the Bratz Fashion Boutique video game.
 Shania – "My friends call me A-Game ‘cuz I’m at the top of my class!" She was produced once for the third edition Style It! collection in 2012.
 Shira – "Hi, I’m Shira. My friends call me Drama Mama ‘cuz I’m all about attention!" She was introduced in the 10th Anniversary Bratz collection in 2010, and was produced once more for the Action Heroez collection in 2013 as well as featuring in the latter's official video game.
 Siernna – "Hi! My name is Siernna My sisters call me Kool-ala!" She was introduced with her sisters, Oriana and Valentina, in the Triiiplets collection in 2005, and was produced with them again for the Babyz Triiiplets collection the following year. She was also produced several times for the Lil' Angelz doll line. She was featured in the video game adaptations of Bratz Forever Diamondz, the live-action film adaptation and Bratz: Girlz Really Rock.
 Sivan – She was produced once for the Babyz Triiipletz collection in 2007 alongside her sisters; Aira and Kesara.
 Sonya – She is the older sister of Cloe, Colin, and Isa, and the daughter of Polita. She was produced once for the World Familiez collection in 2008.
 Sorrel – "My friends call me Urban Cutie ‘cuz I’ve got big city style!" She is twin sisters with Keelin. She was produced once for the sixth edition Twiins collection in 2011 alongside her sister.
 Sorya – She was introduced in the Rodeo collection in 2006 and was produced for the third edition Babyz collection the same year. She was also produced several times for the Itsy Bitsy and Lil' Angelz doll lines.
 Tali – She was introduced in the Babyz Mermaidz collection in 2007 and was later produced several times for the Lil' Angelz doll line.
 Talia – "Hi! My name is Talia, but my friends call me Superstar!" She was introduced in the fifth edition of the Lil' Bratz line in 2004 alongside Ailani, Nazalia, and Zada, and was a core character of that line until 2006.
 Tess – "Hi! My name is Tess! My twin calls me Solo because I always do my own thing!" She is twin sisters with Nona. She was introduced in the second edition Twiins collection in 2005 alongside her sister. She was produced the following year as a component for Babyz with her sister for the second edition Babyz Twiins collection, and was later produced several times for the Lil' Angelz doll line.
 Tessa – "My friends call me Pretty Prankster ‘cuz I’m always making ‘em laugh!" She was produced once for the second edition Style It! collection in 2011.
 Tiana – She was introduced in the Tokyo: a Go-Go collection in 2004 and was also produced for the Tokyo: A Go-Go Collector's Edition collection the same year. She was later produced for the Welcome to Fabulous collection in 2005. She was produced for the third edition Babyz collection in 2006 and several times for the Lil' Angelz doll line. 
 Tiana – "Hi! My name is Tiana! My friends call me Elegant Elephant!" She is sisters with Dana and Maribel. She was produced once for the third edition Triiiplets collection in 2008 with her sisters. 
 Trinity – She was introduced in the second edition Holiday collection in 2006 and was later produced several times for the Lil' Angelz doll line.
 Tyla – "Hi, I'm Tyla. My friends call me Stage Star ‘cuz I'm a star performer!" She was produced once for the 10th Anniversary Bratz collection in 2010. She was featured in the Bratz Fashion Boutique video game.
 Valentina – "Hi! My name is Valentina! My sisters call me Pretty Pup!" She is sisters with Oriana and Siernna. She was introduced in the third edition Twiins collection in 2005 alongside Oriana, though they were later re-released the same year for the Triiiplets collection to include Siernna. They were produced again for the Babyz Triiiplets collection in 2006.
 Vee Filez – She was produced once for the VFiles collection in 2015. She was created in collaboration with the fashion brand VFiles, and was exclusively released on the VFiles website with only 290 dolls produced.
 Yamit – She was produced once for the Babyz The Movie: Lil' Dancers collection in 2006.
 Zada – "Hey, My name is Zada, but my friends call me Sweet Heart!" She was introduced in the fifth edition of the Lil' Bratz line in 2004 alongside Ailani, Nazalia, and Talia, and was a core character of the line until 2006.
 Zama – Her older sister is Sasha. She was produced once as a component of Babyz for the Kidz Sisterz collection in 2006 alongside her sister.

Bratz Boyz

Supporting characters 
 Cameron  – "W’sup?! My name is Cameron! The Bratz call me The Blaze because I’m hot!" His girlfriend is Cloe. He was introduced in the first edition Boyz collection alongside Dylan as the first Bratz Boyz. He was produced in numerous collections including the Lil' Boyz, Babyz and Kidz doll lines. Notably, he is the only Boyz to be produced for the 2015 reboot and the Collectors collection in 2018. He has been voiced by Yuri Lowenthal for Bratz: Starrin' and Stylin', Charlie Schlatter, and Ian James Corlett for the TV series adaptation and various films. He was portrayed by Stephen Sean Ford in the live-action film. He was also featured in the video game adaptations of Bratz Rock Angelz, Bratz Forever Diamondz, the live-action film adaptation, Bratz: Girlz Really Rock, Bratz Fashion Boutique and Bratz: Total Fashion Makeover. He is named after Cameron Larian, son of MGA founder Isaac Larian.
 Dylan – "Hey! My name is Dylan! The Bratz call me The Fox because I’m slick!" He was introduced in the first edition Boyz collection alongside Cameron as the first Bratz Boyz. He was produced in numerous collections including the Lil' Boyz and Kidz doll lines. He has been voiced by Ogie Banks and Adrian Holmes for the TV series adaptation and various films. Banks reprised the role in 2021 for the Talking Bratz web series. He was portrayed by Ian Nelson in the live-action film. He was also featured in the video game adaptations of Bratz Rock Angelz, Bratz Forever Diamondz, the live-action film adaptation and Bratz: Girlz Really Rock.
 Eitan – "W’sup! My name is Eitan! The Bratz call me The Dragon because I’m a nonstop hotshot!" He was introduced in the second edition Boyz collection alongside Koby as the second set of Boyz to be released. He was produced in numerous collections including the Lil' Boyz, Babyz, and Kidz doll lines. He appears in Bratz: Starrin' and Stylin'. He has been voiced by Josh Keaton and Trevor Devall for the television adaptation and various films. He appears in the video game adaptations of Bratz Rock Angelz, Bratz Forever Diamondz, the live-action film adaptation, Bratz: Girlz Really Rock, Bratz: Total Fashion Makeover and Bratz: Flaunt Your Fashion.
 Koby – "Hey! My name is Koby! The Bratz call me The Panther because I’m always on the prowl!" He was introduced in the second edition Boyz collection alongside Eitan as the second set of Boyz to be released. He was produced in numerous collections including the Lil' Boyz and Kidz doll lines. He was featured in Bratz: Starrin' & Stylin', as well as the Bratz Rock Angelz, Bratz Forever Diamondz, Bratz The Movie and Bratz Total Fashion Makeover video games.
 Cade – "Hey! My name is Cade! The Bratz call me The Viper because I’m sly!" He was introduced in the Motorcycle Style collection in 2003, and was produced for numerous collections including the Babyz and Kidz doll lines. He was featured in Bratz: Starrin' & Stylin' and in the Bratz Forever Diamondz and Bratz: The Movie video games.
 Bryce – He was introduced in the Secret Date/Blind Date collection in 2004. He was produced again in 2007 for the Hot Summer Dayz collection and The Movie collection. He was voiced by Adam Wylie for the Bratz: Genie Magic film. He made cameos in the Bratz: Forever Diamondz and Bratz: Fashion Pixiez films. He was also featured in the Bratz Forever Diamondz and Bratz: The Movie video games.

Minor characters 
 Alek – He was produced once for the Boyz Twiins collection in 2006 alongside his twin brother, Zack.
 Braden – He was produced once for the World First Date collection in 2009.
 Brogan – He was produced once for the Masquerade by Bratz collection in 2011.
 Colin – "Hi! My name is Colin, but my friends call me Thunderbolt!" He was introduced in the second edition Lil' Boyz collection in 2004, and was produced several times the same year.
 Colin – Hee is the younger brother of Cloe and Sonya, twin brother of Isa and the son of Polita. He was produced once as a miniature Lil' Angelz component for the World Familiez Babysitter collection in 2009.
 Deavon – "Hey! My name is Deavon, but my friends call me Dynamite!" He was introduced in the second edition Lil' Boyz collection in 2004, and was produced several times the same year.
 Gable – He was produced once for the Masquerade by Bratz collection in 2011.
 Harvey – He was produced once for the Bratz Babyz/Babyz Boyz The Movie collection in 2006 and was featured in its eponymous film where he was voiced by Lisa Ann Beley.
 Iden – He was produced once for the Prince collection in 2006.
 Kobe – He was introduced in the Surfer Cool collection in 2008, and was produced again for the Wild Life collection in 2009.
 Lakin – "Hey! My name is Lakin, but my friends call me Atomic!" He was introduced in the second edition Lil' Boyz collection in 2004, and was produced several times the same year.
 Mikko – "Hey! My name is Mikko, but my friends call me The Shark!" He was introduced in the second edition Lil' Boyz collection in 2004, and was produced several times the same year.
 Penn – He was produced once for the Masquerade by Bratz collection in 2011.
 Thad – "My name is Thad, but they call me Shark!" He was produced once for the On The Mic collection in 2011.
 Wayne – He was produced once for the Rodeo collection in 2006.
 Zack – He was produced once for the Boyz Twiins collection in 2006 alongside his twin brother, Alek.

References

External links 
 

Bratz
Lists of toy characters